The given name Capel may refer to:

Capel Bond (1730–1790), English organist and composer
Capel Lofft (1751–1824), English lawyer, minor political figure and writer
Capel Luckyn (1622–680), English politician and Member of Parliament
Sir Capel Molyneux, 3rd Baronet (1717–1779), Irish politician
Sir Henry Capel Lofft Holden (1856–1937), British engineer and Army officer